The Lieutenant-Governor of Victoria is a government position in the state of Victoria, Australia, acting as a deputy to the Governor of Victoria. When the governor is out of the state, the lieutenant-governor acts as the governor. This office has often been held concurrently by the Chief Justice of Victoria.

History
Prior to the separation of the colony of Victoria from New South Wales in 1851, the area was called the Port Phillip District of New South Wales. The Governor of New South Wales appointed superintendents of the District. In 1839, Captain Charles La Trobe was appointed superintendent. La Trobe became Lieutenant-Governor of Victoria on Victoria's separation from New South Wales on 1 July 1851. On Victoria obtaining responsible government in May 1855, the title of the then incumbent lieutenant-governor, Captain Sir Charles Hotham, became the Governor of Victoria.

When Victoria became a state, the letters patent provided for a lieutenant-governor, but the office was not filled. Instead, following the practice in New South Wales, the Chief Justice of Victoria acted as the governor when required. This changed on 6 November 1886, when Sir William Stawell, the outgoing Chief Justice, was appointed lieutenant governor. The conferring of honors on retiring dignitaries was a common practice in the UK at the time. After his death in 1889, the position again became vacant until Sir John Madden was appointed lieutenant-governor on 10 June 1899. He had already acted as governor by virtue of being Chief Justice, but in line with Stawell's precedent, his direct appointment as lieutenant-governor superseded the administrative power of the Chief Justice.

List of lieutenant-governors of Victoria

References

External links
Official Website of the Governor of Victoria

Victoria